Guy Christian Collet (1929 – 29 October 2004) was a French scientist, explorer and spelunker who came to live in Brazil after World War II. In the karstic region along the Ribeira valley in the State of Sao Paulo he began the exploration for caverns and grottos, becoming later founder and chairman of two speleological societies of deep respectability in the field of speleology in the country. He did work in the areas of underground biology, archeology, nutrition techniques in caves, besides having published several books and reports on the subject.

Biography
Collet began his speleological career in 1962. In 1964 he explored Gruta Casa de Pedra, where he first contacted Michel Le Bret and Pierre Martin. Collet and his friends traveled kilometers on the weekends to visit the caves in the route Caçapava–Iporanga. He mapped and explored the caves Pescaria, Chapéu, Gruta Casa de Pedra, Água Suja, Alambari, Arataca, Areias de Cima e de Baixo, Caverna de Santana, Gruta do Pierre, Bethary, Abismo da Paçoca and many others.

In 1969, he took part in the crossing of the Caverna do Diabo with Michel Le Bret, J. L. Bret and Valla. He was elected president of the SBE in November 1973. In 1974 he founded the first underground laboratory in South America called LABSUB. He was then accredited by IPHAN for archaeological research in several regions of Brazil. He participated in several speleological expeditions in the State of Goiás and Bahia between 1971-1973, mapping the Mangabeira Cave in Bahia along with other scientists, Lapa da Terra Ronca in Goias, São Matheus, São Vicente, Angélica, etc. He has authored numerous articles in magazines and the "Glossary of Speleological Terms", besides being a special lecturer at colleges, universities and conferences.

See also
Sigismund Ernst Richard Krone
Peter Wilhelm Lund

Books
Collet, Guy Christian, Considerações sobre algumas peças líticas de "Pavão" (Itaoca, Apiai, SP), Departamento de arqueologia da SBE, Sao Paulo (1980), 
Collet, Guy Christian, Descrição e algumas medidas referentes as pontas de projeteis de Itaoca (Apiai, SP), Departamento de arqueologia da SBE, Sao Paulo (1980),

References

1929 births
2004 deaths
French explorers
French naturalists
20th-century naturalists